Kipeá (Quipea), or Kariri, was a Karirian language of Brazil. It is sometimes considered a dialect of a single Kariri language. A short grammatical treatment is available.

Documentation
Kipeá is well documented by Luiz Mamiani, a Jesuit priest who wrote a grammar and catechism of the Kipeá language during the late 1600s.

Grammar
The morphology of the Kipeá language is predominantly isolating and analytic, unusual for a language native to the Americas.

Phonology 
Phonology of the Kipeá language:

A voiced plosive [ɡ] can have an allophone of [ŋ].

See also 

 Dzubukuá language

Further reading
Ribeiro, E. R. (2010). Tapuya connections: language contact in eastern Brazil. LIAMES: Línguas Indígenas Americanas, 9(1), 61-76.

References

Analytic languages
Isolating languages
Kariri languages
Extinct languages of South America
Languages extinct in the 20th century